John or Jack Grundy may refer to:
 John Grundy (television presenter) (born 1946), English television presenter and author
 John Grundy Sr. (c. 1696–1748), English land surveyor and civil engineer
 John Grundy Jr. (1719–1783), English civil, drainage and canal engineer
 Jack Grundy (footballer) (1873–?), English association footballer
 Jack Grundy (rugby league) (1926–1978), English rugby league player
 John Clowes Grundy (1806–1867), English printseller and art patron
 Jack Grundy (cricketer) (born 1994), English  cricketer